The 2000–01 NBA season was the 12th season for the Orlando Magic in the National Basketball Association. In the 2000 NBA draft, the Magic selected Mike Miller from the University of Florida with the fifth overall pick, selected Keyon Dooling from the University of Missouri with the tenth pick, and selected Courtney Alexander out of Fresno State with the thirteenth pick. However, the team traded Dooling to the Los Angeles Clippers, and dealt Alexander to the Dallas Mavericks. During the off-season, the Magic acquired Tracy McGrady from the Toronto Raptors, and acquired All-Star forward Grant Hill from the Detroit Pistons. The Magic had nearly signed then-free agent All-Star forward Tim Duncan, whom led the San Antonio Spurs to their first championship title the year before. However, Duncan would re-sign with the Spurs. Additionally, the Magic also signed free agents Troy Hudson, Dee Brown and Don Reid, and acquired Andrew DeClercq from the Cleveland Cavaliers.

However, Hill re-injured his left ankle from the previous season after only playing just four games, and was out for the remainder of the season, as the Magic struggled losing 11 of their first 16 games in November. Meanwhile, Brown only appeared in just seven games due to a left quadricep tendon injury. Despite losing both Hill and Brown, the Magic posted a nine-game winning streak between January and February, held a 25–23 record at the All-Star break, and returned to the playoffs after a one-year absence, finishing fourth in the Atlantic Division with a 43–39 record.

McGrady averaged 26.8 points, 7.5 rebounds, 4.6 assists, 1.5 steals and 1.5 blocks per game, and was named Most Improved Player of the Year. He was also named to the All-NBA Second Team, finished in sixth place in Most Valuable Player voting, and was selected for the 2001 NBA All-Star Game, which was his first All-Star appearance. Hill was also selected for the All-Star Game, but did not play due to his ankle injury, as he averaged 13.8 points and 6.3 rebounds and assists per game each during his short 4-game stint. In addition, Darrell Armstrong provided the team with 15.9 points, 7.0 assists and 1.8 steals per game, while Miller contributed 11.9 points per game and was named Rookie of the Year, and selected to the NBA All-Rookie First Team, and Bo Outlaw averaged 7.3 points, 7.7 rebounds, 1.3 steals and 1.7 blocks per game. Off the bench, Pat Garrity contributed 8.3 points per game, and John Amaechi provided with 7.9 points per game.

However, in the playoffs, the Magic lost in four games in the Eastern Conference First Round to the Milwaukee Bucks. Following the season, Amaechi signed as a free agent with the Utah Jazz. For the season, the Magic changed their primary logo, and slightly changed their uniforms, adding their new alternate logo on the right leg of their shorts. The primary logo remained in use until 2010.

Draft picks

Roster

Roster Notes
 Small forward Grant Hill played 4 games (his last game being on December 12, 2000), but missed the rest of the season and the playoffs due to having season-ending surgery on his left ankle, which involved removing a metal plate and five screws from the inside portion of Hill's ankle, and replacing the plate with a bone graft from his pelvis, then inserting new screws.

Regular season

Season standings

z – clinched division title
y – clinched division title
x – clinched playoff spot

Record vs. opponents

Game log

Playoffs

|- align="center" bgcolor="#ffcccc"
| 1
| April 22
| @ Milwaukee
| L 90–103
| Tracy McGrady (33)
| McGrady, Outlaw (9)
| Tracy McGrady (8)
| Bradley Center18,717
| 0–1
|- align="center" bgcolor="#ffcccc"
| 2
| April 25
| @ Milwaukee
| L 96–103
| Tracy McGrady (35)
| Doleac, Outlaw (7)
| Tracy McGrady (7)
| Bradley Center18,717
| 0–2
|- align="center" bgcolor="#ccffcc"
| 3
| April 28
| Milwaukee
| W 121–116 (OT)
| Tracy McGrady (42)
| Bo Outlaw (14)
| Tracy McGrady (10)
| TD Waterhouse Centre17,248
| 1–2
|- align="center" bgcolor="#ffcccc"
| 4
| May 1
| Milwaukee
| L 104–112
| Tracy McGrady (25)
| Bo Outlaw (12)
| Armstrong, McGrady (8)
| TD Waterhouse Centre17,248
| 1–3
|-

Player statistics

Season

Playoffs

Awards and honors
 Tracy McGrady – Most Improved Player, All-NBA 2nd Team, All-Star
 Mike Miller – Rookie of the Year, All-Rookie 1st Team
 Grant Hill – All-Star

Transactions

References

Orlando Magic seasons
2000 in sports in Florida
2001 in sports in Florida